Don Carlos Patrick Ragan (November 15, 1883 – September 4, 1956) was an American professional baseball pitcher. He played in Major League Baseball (MLB) during 11 seasons from 1909 to 1923 for seven different teams, primarily the Brooklyn Dodgers / Robins and Boston Braves.

On October 5, 1914, Ragan became the second National League pitcher and the third pitcher in major-league history to throw an immaculate inning, striking out all three batters on nine total pitches in the eighth inning of a game against the Boston Braves.

References

External links

Major League Baseball pitchers
1883 births
1956 deaths
Cincinnati Reds players
Chicago Cubs players
Cornell Rams baseball players
Brooklyn Dodgers players
Brooklyn Superbas players
Brooklyn Robins players
New York Giants (NL) players
Chicago White Sox players
Philadelphia Phillies players
Boston Braves players
Baseball players from Iowa
Philadelphia Phillies coaches
Minor league baseball managers
Terre Haute Hottentots players
Omaha Rourkes players
Rochester Bronchos players
Oakland Oaks (baseball) players
Cumberland Colts players
People from Page County, Iowa